The Felton Covered Bridge is a covered bridge over the San Lorenzo River in Felton, Santa Cruz County in the U.S. state of California. Built in 1892, the bridge employs a Brown truss structural system and is approximately 80 feet long. The bridge became a California Historical Landmark in 1957, was placed on the National Register of Historic Places in 1973, and had a major restoration in 1987 after being damaged in storms in the winter of 1982.

It is considered to be the tallest covered bridge in the United States, and was the main entry point for Felton for 45 years.

The bridge is no longer used on the roadway, but is accessible to pedestrians visiting the Felton Covered Bridge Park.

See also
List of bridges in the United States
List of covered bridges in California
National Register of Historic Places listings in Santa Cruz County, California

References

External links

 Felton Covered Bridge – Santa Cruz County Parks

Covered bridges on the National Register of Historic Places in California
Bridges completed in 1892
History of Santa Cruz County, California
History of the Monterey Bay Area
Transportation buildings and structures in Santa Cruz County, California
Truss bridges in the United States
Wooden bridges in California
Tourist attractions in Santa Cruz County, California
Parks in Santa Cruz County, California
Regional parks in California
Pedestrian bridges in California
Former road bridges in the United States
National Register of Historic Places in Santa Cruz County, California
Road bridges on the National Register of Historic Places in California